

About Indian Energy Exchange  

Indian Energy Exchange (IEX) is India’s premier energy marketplace, providing a nationwide automated trading platform for the physical delivery of electricity, renewables, and certificates. More recently, IEX has pioneered cross-border electricity trade expanding its power market beyond India to create an integrated South Asian Power Market. IEX is powered by state-of-the-art, intuitive and customer-centric technology, enabling efficient price discovery and facilitating the ease of power procurement.

IEX has a robust ecosystem of 7,300+ registered participants located across 29 States and 5 Union Territories, comprising 55+ distribution utilities, 1,500+ RE Generators & Obligated Entities and 600+ generators. It also has a strong base of 4400+ commercial and industrial consumers representing industries such as metal, food processing, textile, cement, ceramic, chemicals, automobiles, information technology industries, institutional, housing, real estate, and commercial entities.

The Exchange has ISO Certifications for quality management, Information security management and environmental management since August 2016 and is approved and regulated by the Central Electricity Regulatory Commission and has been operating since 27 June 2008. The Exchange is a publicly listed company with NSE and BSE since October 2017.

Since inception, the exchange has traded a cumulative volume of more than 680 BU till January 2023.

Board of Directors and Management 

Board of Directors 

 Mr. Gautam Dalmia, Non-Executive Director
 Mr. Satyanarayan Goel, Chairman and Managing Director
 Ms. Sudha Pilai, Independent Director
 Prof. Kayyalathu Thomas Chacko, Independent Director
 Mr. Tejpreet S Chopra, Independent Director
 Mr. Amit Garg, Non–Executive Director

Management Team

 Mr. Satyanarayan Goel, Chairman and Managing Director
 Mr. Vineet Harlalka, CFO & Company Secretary
 Mr. Rohit Bajaj, Head, Business Development, Regulatory Affairs & Strategy
 Mr. Samir Prakash, Head - Human Resources & Administration
 Mr. Amit Kumar, Head - Market Operations & NPI
 Mr. Sangh Suman Gautam, Chief Technology Officer

History 

In 2003, the Electricity Act (‘EA 2003’) set the stage for promoting competition in the sector and providing a choice to consumers by de-licensing generation and recognising trading as a licensed activity. The Act gave powers to the regulator to promote competition and market development. With the foundation laid by the EA 2003 and an enabling policy cum regulatory framework, Indian Energy Exchange commenced operations on 27th June 2008.

Since then, the prices discovered on the exchange have provided critical signals to the sector and policy makers. Prices discovered on the IEX platform are a function of the buy and sell bids received without any other influence on the price discovery process. IEX has also provided a platform for distribution companies to manage their demand more efficiently and optimise costs by replacing costlier power available through long-term contracts with competitively priced power available on the exchange.

In October 2017, the company was listed on the Indian stock exchanges, making it a publicly owned company.

Product & Services 

IEX was envisioned as a neutral platform where participants from different segments of the sector may participate and utilize the range of products and services to match their needs. The participants are required to bear a membership and participate in the bid for the respective product/service. The exchange has launched a range of products that are broadly classified as Electricity Market, Green Market and Certificates.

Electricity Market

 Day Ahead Market - A physical electricity trading market for deliveries for any/some/all 15- minute time blocks in 24 hours of the next day, starting from midnight. The prices and quantum of electricity to be traded are determined through a double-sided closed auction bidding process.

 Term Ahead Market - Includes a range of products allowing participants to buy/sell electricity on a term basis for a duration of up to 11 days ahead. Products in the Term Ahead-Market include Intra-day, Day-Ahead Contingency, Daily and Weekly contracts to help participants manage their electricity portfolio for different durations.

Since receiving approval vide CERC Regulations in June 2022, IEX is offering Term Ahead Market contracts ranging up to 90 days.

 Real-Time Market - A market segment with a new auction session every half an hour with power to be delivered after 4-time blocks or an hour after the gate closure of the auction. The price and quantum of electricity trading is determined through a double-sided closed auction bidding process.

 Cross Border Electricity Trade - IEX Pioneered Cross Border Electricity Trade with the commencement of trade with Nepal in its Day ahead electricity market on April 17, 2021. The Cross border in electricity is an endeavour to expand the Indian power market towards building an integrated South Asian Power Market. To begin with, the grid-connected South Asian countries such as Nepal, Bhutan and Bangladesh will be able to participate in Day-ahead Market and Term-ahead Market on the Exchange. Subsequently, as the grid connectivity extends to other southern countries, the market will expand further.

Green Market

 Green Term Ahead Market - The market segment for trading in delivery-based renewable energy. The market commenced on 21 August 2020 following the CERC approval. The market segment features contracts such as Intra-day, Day-ahead Contingency, Daily and Weekly, separate for solar and non-solar segments. The matching mechanism is continuous trading for Intra-day, Day-Ahead Contingency and Daily contracts, whereas the double-sided open auction process will be implemented Weekly.

 Green Day-Ahead Market - The market is allowing anonymous and double-sided closed collective auctions in renewable energy on a day-ahead basis. The market commenced on 26 Oct'21. The Exchange invites bids for conventional and renewable in an integrated way through separate bidding windows. The clearing takes place in a sequential manner – first in the renewable segment having the must-run status, considering the availability of the transmission corridor, followed by the conventional segment, discovering different price formations for green and conventional power.

Certificate Market

 Renewable Energy Certificates - The green attributes of electricity generated from renewable resources. There are two categories of REC - Solar and Non-solar. One certificate represents 1 MWh of energy generated. REC is positioned as the key driver of the renewable energy market because of its flexibility and the fact that they are not subject to the geographic and physical limitations of the underlying commodity, electricity. The obligated entities purchase RE to fulfill their Renewable Purchase Obligation.

 Energy Saving Certificates - The market-based instrument designed for consumers in energy-intensive industries and sectors in order to reduce their specific energy consumption for every compliance period, in accordance with specified targets. The certificates are created under the Perform Achieve Trade scheme of the Ministry of Power.

Key Milestones 

 2008: Day-Ahead Market Commenced operations with 58 participants Daily cleared volume in DAM: 20 million units
 2009: Registered first open access customer, launched Term-Ahead Market
 2010: Registered participants in DAM crossed 500+
 2011: Introduced Renewable Energy Certificate in the market, first non-solar REC traded
 2012: Introduced 15-min contract in DAM, first solar REC traded, Signed MOU with PJM Technologies
 2013: MOU with EPEX SPOT (France)
 2015: Round the clock Term-Ahead Market
 2016: India’s first energy exchange to get ISO Certifications
 2017: Launched Energy Saving Certificates, listed on the NSE & BSE
 2018: Signs MOU with JEPX (Japan)
 2019: Highest DAM volume in a day, reached 306 MU
 2020: Two new bid types and TAM contract enhancement,  Real-Time Electricity Market,  MOU with Power Ledger, Australia, Indian Gas Exchange, Green Term-Ahead Market
 2021: Cross Border Electricity Trading, Green Day-Ahead Market, Advanced MILP algorithm, Web based trading portal
 2022: Term Ahead Market with contracts upto 90 days

Finance

Subsidiary Companies 

Indian Gas Exchange (IGX) 

The Indian Gas Exchange was launched on 15 June 2020 by Shri Dharmendra Pradhan, the then Honourable Minister of Petroleum and Natural Gas. IGX secured authorisation from Petroleum and Natural Gas Regulatory Board on 2 December 2020, to operate as India's first Gas Exchange. The Exchange’s vision is aligned with the Government’s stated ambition to increase the share of gas in India’s energy mix from the present 6% to 15% by the year 2030.

IGX leverages technology and innovation to operate a nationwide, transparent, and competitive marketplace for the trading of gas and petroleum products, toward facilitating India’s strategic aspiration of building a gas-based economy.

With a robust ecosystem of 21 Members and more than 500 Clients, currently, IGX operates from 5 gas hubs - Dahej, Hazira, Dabhol, Jaigarh & KG Basin and offers a broad spectrum of products to trade in Day Ahead, Weekly, Weekday, Fortnightly and Monthly contracts. IGX cumulatively achieved 50+ lac MMBTU gas volume since December 2020. The platform has been facilitating indigenous price discovery, which is further stimulating demand, driving industrial competitiveness, spurring investments in the value chain and delivering efficient utilisation of the pipeline infrastructure as well as ensuring the revival of gas-based power plants.

Sustainability 
IEX is committed to sustainably transition India’s energy market through efficient and asset-light businesses. The Energy Conservation Act 2022 has proposed to establish a carbon market in the country and IEX is exploring opportunities in the carbon credits market. IEX aims to provide a platform that will play an instrumental role in fulfilling global and national sustainability aspirations. India has huge potential to trade carbon credits, as corporates want to buy carbon credits on a voluntary basis to comply with the ESG requirements to be carbon neutral.

Further, IEX is India’s first carbon-neutral Power Exchange, using market based tradable instruments to offset its carbon emissions. This will help IEX members and participants to reduce their Scope 3 emissions by building a greener value chain. IEX will continue to make significant contributions through technology and innovation, to help India build a sustainable and energy-efficient economy.

Offices 

 North - Noida
 West - Mumbai, Ahmedabad
 South - Chennai, Hyderabad, Bengaluru
 East - Kolkata

Corporate Culture 
Indian Energy Exchange has been certified as a Great Place To Work® in India for the year January 2023 – 24. IEX has received this global recognition in the ‘mid-size company’ category. IEX is India’s first Great Place To Work Certified Power Exchange. 

At IEX, we believe in a healthy work-life balance by providing an open and transparent work culture that places adequate emphasis on employee experience, feedback and suggestions. Regular employee training and engagement activities, including interactions with the leaders of the organisation through various forums are undertaken. Employees are core strength and key differentiators for the company as they ensure a strong bond with them. IEX is highly committed and engaged towards employees and continuously delivers growth for the organization, by creating value for the customers.

Awards & Accolades 

 Most Promising Company of the Year Award| Coveted India Business Leader Award (IBLA) 2022 by CNBC TV18
 Best Power Exchange in India| First View Intelligent Business Award 2019
 Best Power Exchange in India & South Asia| Enertia Award 2018
 Best IPO in Mid Cap Segment IR Society of India| Investor Relations Award 2018

External links
India Energy Exchange
https://www.igxindia.com/

Electric power exchanges
Energy in India
Commodity exchanges in India
Electric power in India
Energy infrastructure in India
2008 establishments in Delhi
Indian companies established in 2008
Companies based in Delhi
Companies listed on the National Stock Exchange of India
Companies listed on the Bombay Stock Exchange